The Tampa Bay Derby is a Grade III American Thoroughbred horse race for three years old horses over the distance of  miles on the dirt scheduled annually in March at Tampa Bay Downs racetrack in Oldsmar, Florida. The event currently carries a purse of $400,000.

History

The inaugural running of the event was on 21 March 1981 as the Budweiser Tampa Bay Derby Stakes with sponsorship for Budweiser making it the richest stakes race at the track. The event was won by the long shot Paristo, who was part of the field entry of horses at the odds of 35-1 in a time of 1:45. Such was the immediate impact the event had that in 1984 the event was classified as Grade III. Budweiser ceased their sponsorship in 1987.

The event was downgraded to Listed in 1991 and held this status until 2002 when it was upgraded back to Grade III.

In 2007, Street Sense became the first Tampa Bay Derby participant to win the Kentucky Derby. In 2010, Super Saver won the Kentucky Derby after finishing third in the Tampa Bay Derby.

In 2011 the event was upgraded to Grade II.

From 1995–2010, the Tampa Bay Derby and the Florida Oaks were run on the same race card. They were again presented on the same day in 2013, along with the Hillsborough Stakes, providing fans three graded stakes worth a combined $700,000.

The race has gained in popularity over the past few years and is now listed as high profile Championship series event on the Road to the Kentucky Derby. 

Since 2016, the race has been called the Lambholm South Tampa Bay Derby due to sponsorship.

In 2023 the American Graded Stakes Committee of the Thoroughbred Owners and Breeders Association downgraded the event back to Grade III.

Records
Speed record:
 1:41.90 – Tacitus (2019)

Margins:
 5 lengths – Thundering Storm (1996), Carpe Diem (2015)

Most wins by a jockey:
 2 – Richard Migliore (2000, 2001)
 2 – Pat Day (1998, 2004)
 2 – Eibar Coa (2003, 2008)
 2 – Daniel Centeno  (2009, 2014)
 2 – John Velazquez (2013, 2015)
 2 – Jose L. Ortiz (2017, 2019)

Most wins by a trainer:
 6 – Todd A. Pletcher (2004, 2013, 2015, 2016, 2017, 2023)

Most wins by an owner:
 2 – Eric Fein (2008, 2009)
 2 – WinStar Farm (2015, 2018)

Winners

Notes:

§ Ran as an entry

‡ Ran as the field entry

See also
 Road to the Kentucky Derby
 List of American and Canadian Graded races

External sites
Tampa Bay Downs Media Guide 2021

References

1981 establishments in Florida
Horse races in Florida
Tampa Bay Downs
Flat horse races for three-year-olds
Triple Crown Prep Races
Graded stakes races in the United States
Recurring sporting events established in 1981
Sports competitions in Tampa, Florida
Grade 3 stakes races in the United States